Karkasheh (also Romanized as Gargasheh) is a village in Shaban Rural District, in the Central District of Meshgin Shahr County, Ardabil Province, Iran. At the 2006 census, its population was 66, in 14 families.

References 

Towns and villages in Meshgin Shahr County